The IHF Men's Junior World Championship is the official competition for men's national handball teams of under-21 years category. It is being organized by the International Handball Federation since 1977. It takes place every two years in odd years.

Tournaments

Medal table

Participating nations

References

External links
ihf.info

 
Junior